Joaquín Gho (born 14 May 2003) is an Argentine professional footballer who plays as a right midfielder for Sarmiento.

Career
Gho began his career aged three with Rivadavia, remaining until the age of thirteen when he departed for Sarmiento in 2016. He spent the next four years progressing through their youth system, notably finishing as the top scorer at his level in his final two years in it. Gho made the jump into the club's first-team squad in December 2020 under manager Iván Delfino, who resigned after selecting the right midfielder on the bench for three fixtures in Primera B Nacional. His senior debut arrived in Mario Sciacqua's first match, as the new coach subbed him on with five minutes left of a win away to Deportivo Riestra on 28 December.

Personal life
Gho's father, Juan Carlos, worked as a technical director; notably for Rivadavia.

Career statistics
.

References

External links

2003 births
Living people
People from Lincoln Partido
Argentine footballers
Association football midfielders
Primera Nacional players
Club Atlético Sarmiento footballers
Sportspeople from Buenos Aires Province